Proscinetes is an extinct genus of prehistoric ray-finned fish from the Jurassic.

See also

 Prehistoric fish
 List of prehistoric bony fish

References

Pycnodontiformes genera
Jurassic bony fish
Extinct animals of Europe